Saint Anthony's Hospital is a historic hospital building at 202 East Green Street in Morrilton, Arkansas.  Built in 1935 to a design by A. N. McAninch, it is an Art Deco building, finished in brick and stone.  It served as the local hospital until 1970, and is now a senior living facility.  It is Morrilton's best example of Art Deco architecture.  It has two splayed wings, with a central projecting entry pavilion.

The building was listed on the National Register of Historic Places in 1986.

See also
National Register of Historic Places listings in Conway County, Arkansas

References

Hospital buildings on the National Register of Historic Places in Arkansas
Art Deco architecture in Arkansas
Buildings and structures in Morrilton, Arkansas
National Register of Historic Places in Conway County, Arkansas
Hospital buildings completed in 1935
1935 establishments in Arkansas